Gavin Courtney Tonge (born 13 January 1983) is a West Indian cricketer. He is a right-arm fast-medium bowler and has represented the West Indies cricket team in One Day International and Test cricket, as well as playing first-class cricket for Antigua and Leeward Islands.

Career
Tonge began his first-class career in the 2002/03 season, having played in under-19 matches since 2000. He played his first game for Leeward Islands on 28 February 2003. He returned single-figure wicket tallies for his first five seasons, without a five-wicket-haul, however in the 2008–09 season he took 44 wickets at 25.09, including four five-wicket-hauls. His efforts led to a place in the West Indies ODI team.

Tonge was also selected to represent the West Indies at the 2009 ICC Champions Trophy and featured in their opening defeat at the hands of Pakistan on 23 September 2009, earning his best ever bowling figures in limited overs cricket of 4/25.

He made his Test debut against Australia in December 2009 in Perth when he replaced the injured Darren Sammy.

Notes

External links

1983 births
Living people
Antigua and Barbuda cricketers
West Indies Test cricketers
West Indies One Day International cricketers
West Indies Twenty20 International cricketers
Leeward Islands cricketers
Antigua Hawksbills cricketers